The black-backed thrush or New Britain thrush (Zoothera talaseae) is a species of bird in the family Turdidae. It is endemic to Papua New Guinea where it occurs on the islands of New Britain, Umboi and Bougainville. Its natural habitats are temperate, subtropical or tropical moist lowland forests and subtropical or tropical moist montane forests.

Some authorities considered one of the two subspecies recognised, the Bougainville thrush (Z. t. atrigena), as a separate species as Zoothera atrigena.

References

Birds described in 1926
Birds of Bougainville Island
Birds of New Britain
Endemic fauna of Papua New Guinea
Bougainville thrush
Taxonomy articles created by Polbot